São José da Laje is a municipality located in the western of the Brazilian state of Alagoas. Its population was 23,996 (2020) and its area is 265 km².

References

Municipalities in Alagoas